Umayangana Wickramasinghe (born 24 October 1980 ) is an actress in Sri Lankan cinema, stage drama and television as well as a television host. She is best known for the role in television serials Ithin Ita Passe and Jeewithe Lassanai.

Personal life
She was born on 24 October 1980 in Borella as the eldest of the family. Her father Sunil Wickramasinghe worked at the Sri Lanka Railways and mother Anula Kanthi Kumari worked at the Sri Lanka Broadcasting Corporation. She has one younger brother, Mahesh Wickramasinghe.

She completed primary education at Basilica Maha Vidyalaya, Ragama and then secondary education at St. Paul's Girls School in the Milagiriya district of Colombo. After finishing school times, she followed a course in medicine conducted by The Ministry of Health Care and Nutrition. and began her career as a news presenter for Derana TV and then as a news presenter at Sri Satellite TV.

Career
She started to act in stage dramas such as Daya Wayaman's 2002 production Neinage Suduwa conducted by the Sudarshi Institute and acted in Shakespeare dramas as "Desdemona" in Othello and as "Gertrude" in Hamlet.

Her first television appearance came through the television drama Katu Imbula, directed by Sudath Rohana. She became popular with the role "Dhananjana" in serial Jeewithe Lassanai and role "Dedunu" in serial Ithin Ita Passe. In 2010, she won the Most Popular Tele Drama Actress award at the Sumathi award ceremony for that role.

Her maiden cinema appearance came through film Uyanata Mal Genna directed by Chandrarathna Mapitigama. However, the film is not yet released. Her first screened film is 2012 film Wassane Senehasa directed by Densil Jayaweera.

She hosted the television reality program Ranaviru Real Star telecast by Rupavahini.

Selected stage dramas
 Maraka Linde Sawariyak (Director - Chalaka Ranasooriya)
 Raja Man Wahala (Director - Chamika Hathlahawatta )
 Thunsiya Heta Eka (361) (Director - Udayasiri Wikramarathna)
 Rathu Wes Muhuna - Oedipus (Director - Priyankara Rathnayaka)

Selected television serials

 Ahanna Kenek Na - Can You Hear Me 
 Arumawanthi
 Dewana Maw 
 Fenshui Gedara
 Gamane Ya
 Hadawathe Kathawa
 Ithin Eta Passe
 Jeewithe Lassanai
 Kota Uda Mandira
 Maya Sakmana
 Nadu Ahana Walawwa
 Nisala Sanda Numba
 Nodath Desheka Arumawanthi
 Pathini 
 Peramaga Salakunu 
 Pingala Danawwa
 Piyavi 
 Sewwandi
 Sihina Samagama 
 Sil
 Sudu Andagena Kalu Awidin
 Sundarai Premaya
 Suriya Sunera
 Thriloka
 Udu Sulanga
 Uthuwankande Sura Saradiel
 Veeduru Malak
 Walakulu

Filmography

References

External links 
 
 
 මිදි ඇඹුල් කියලා නරියෙකුත් කිව්වා... Umayangana Wickramasinghe

Sri Lankan film actresses
1980 births
Living people